The Monroe metropolitan satatistical area is a metropolitan area in northern Louisiana that covers three parishes—Ouachita, Union, and Morehouse. According to the 2010 United States census, the MSA had a population of 180,782, which increased to 207,104 at the 2020 census.

Parishes 
 Ouachita
 Union

Communities

Cities 
 Monroe (Principal city)
 West Monroe (Suburb of Monroe)

Towns 
 Bernice
 Farmerville
 Marion
 Richwood
 Sterlington

Villages 
 Conway
 Downsville
 Junction City
 Lillie
 Spearsville
 Truxno

Census-designated places 
 Brownsville-Bawcomville
 Calhoun
 Claiborne
 Lakeshore
 Swartz

Demographics 
As of the census of 2000, there were 170,053 people, 64,073 households, and 44,731 families residing within the MSA. By the publication of the 2020 United States census, its population increased to 207,104. With the publication of the 2020 American Community Survey, its population decreased to an estimated 202,138.

In 2000, the racial and ethnic makeup of Metropolitan Monroe was 65.19% White, 32.87% African American, 0.22% Native American, 0.59% Asian, 0.03% Pacific Islander, 0.45% from other races, and 0.65% from two or more races. Hispanic or Latinos of any race were 1.30% of the population; the 2020 American Community Survey's 5-year census estimates program determined its racial and ethnic makeup was 58% White, 38% Black or African American, 1% Asian, 1% multiracial, and 2% Hispanic or Latino of any race.

At the 2000 census, the median income for a household in the MSA was $30,544, and the median income for a family was $38,120. Males had a median income of $31,055 versus $22,105 for females. The per capita income for the MSA was $15,952; in 2020, its median income increased to $43,212 with 23.5% of its population living at or below the poverty line.

See also 
 Louisiana census statistical areas
 List of cities, towns, and villages in Louisiana
 List of census-designated places in Louisiana

References

External links 

 
Geography of Ouachita Parish, Louisiana
Geography of Union Parish, Louisiana